Michael Cramer (1 March 1930 in Wickrath – 28 November 2000 Munich) was a German actor.

Selected filmography 
A Life for Do (1954)
A House Full of Love (1954) 
Fireworks (1954)
 The Perfect Couple (1954)
Island of the Dead (1955)
 The Royal Waltz (1955)
Through the Forests and Through the Trees (1956)
 The Hunter from Roteck (1956)
 Engagement at Wolfgangsee (1956)
 (1957)
The Big Chance (1957)
Sebastian Kneipp (1958)
Ooh... diese Ferien (1958)
Babette Goes to War (1959)
The Battle of Sutjeska (1973)
Stolen Heaven (1974)

References

External links

1930 births
2000 deaths
German male film actors
People from Mönchengladbach
20th-century German male actors